Sinomonas echigonensis is a bacterium from the genus Sinomonas.

References

External links
Type strain of Sinomonas echigonensis at BacDive -  the Bacterial Diversity Metadatabase

Further reading 
 
 

Bacteria described in 2009
Micrococcaceae